"Proof by Induction" is a 2021 science fiction short story by José Pablo Iriarte. It was first published in Uncanny Magazine.

Synopsis
Paulie is a mathematician who uses a recording of his dead father's mind in an attempt to solve a particularly difficult problem.

Reception
"Proof by Induction" was a finalist for the 2022 Hugo Award for Best Short Story, and for the Nebula Award for Best Short Story of 2021.

References

2021 short stories
Science fiction short stories

External links
Text of the story, at Uncanny Magazine
Essay by Iriarte on the process of writing the story